The following is a list of the IRMA's number-one singles of 1993.

References

See also
1993 in music
List of artists who reached number one in Ireland

1993 in Irish music
1993 record charts
1993